The Macintosh IIsi is a personal computer designed, manufactured and sold by Apple Computer, Inc. from October 1990 to March 1993. Introduced as a lower-cost alternative to the other Macintosh II family of desktop models, it was popular for home use, as it offered more expandability and performance than the Macintosh LC, which was introduced at the same time. Like the LC, it has built-in sound support, as well as support for color displays, with a maximum screen resolution of 640 × 480 in 8-bit color.

The IIsi remained on the market for two and a half years and was discontinued shortly after the introduction of its replacement, the Centris 610.

Hardware 
The IIsi's case design is a compact desktop unit not used for any other Macintosh model, one of the few Macintosh designs that was used for a single model. Positioned below the Macintosh IIci as Apple's entry-level professional model, the IIsi's price was lowered by the redesign of the motherboard substituting a different memory controller and the deletion of all but one of the expansion card slots (a single Processor Direct Slot) and removal of the level 2 cache slot. 

It shipped with either a 40-MB or 80-MB internal hard disk, and a 1.44-MB floppy disk drive. The Motorola 68882 FPU was an optional upgrade, mounted on a special plug-in card. Ports included SCSI, two serial ports, an ADB port, a floppy drive port, and 3.5mm stereo headphone sound output and microphone sound input sockets.

A bridge card was available for the IIsi to convert the Processor Direct slot to a standard internal NuBus card slot, compatible with other machines in the Macintosh II family. The bridge card included the 68882 FPU to improve floating-point performance. The NuBus card was mounted horizontally above the motherboard.

To cut costs, the IIsi's video shared the main system memory, which also had the effect of slowing down video considerably, especially as the IIsi had 1 MB of slow RAM soldered to the motherboard. David Pogue's book Macworld Macintosh Secrets observed that one could speed up video considerably if one set the disk cache size large enough to force the computer to draw video RAM from faster RAM installed in the SIMM banks.

The IIsi also suffers from sound difficulties: over time, the speaker contacts can fail, causing the sound to periodically drop out. This problem was caused by the very modular construction of the computer, where the mono loudspeaker is on a daughterboard under the motherboard, with springy contacts. Speaker vibrations led to fretting of the touching surfaces. The problem could be solved by removing the motherboard and using a pencil eraser to clean the contacts of the daughterboard holding the loudspeaker. As the IIsi is the only Macintosh to use this case design, these issues were never corrected in a subsequent model. The IIsi was designed to be easily and cheaply manufactured, such that no tools were required to put one together – everything is held in place with clips or latches.

Because of its heritage as a cut-down IIci, it was a simple modification to substitute a new clock crystal to increase the system's clock rate to 25 MHz for a slight increase in performance and a large increase in video rendering speed.

Known users 
Charles Bukowski was an enthusiastic user of the IIsi.

Timeline

References

External links
Macintosh IIsi teardown at ifixit.com

si
IIsi
IIsi
IIsi
IIsi
Computer-related introductions in 1990